Yıldırımtepe is a quarter of the town Çıldır, Çıldır District, Ardahan Province, Turkey. Its population is 172 (2021).

References

Çıldır District